The seventeenth season of Australian reality television series The Block, titled The Block: Fans v Faves, premiered on 8 August 2021 on the Nine Network. Hosts Scott Cam and Shelley Craft, site foremen Keith Schleiger and Dan Reilly, and judges Neale Whitaker, Shaynna Blaze and Darren Palmer, all returned from the previous season.

Production

Applications for the seventeenth season of the series opened in August 2020 until 27 September 2020, looking for couples aged between 18 and 65 years old being sought by casting agents. Filming is expected to be a 10–12 week shoot period from late February 2021 In September 2020, the seventeenth season of The Block was officially confirmed at Nine's 2021 upfronts. In October 2020, it was reported that 5 properties on Bronte Court in Hampton, Victoria, were in the process of being purchased by Nine. In December 2020, it was confirmed that Bronte Court will be the next location for renovation, Nine Network acquired five houses in the area for $11.5 million combined.

In July 2021, it was officially confirmed the season will be Fans vs Faves, although this is the second time the title Fans vs Faves will be used, this is actually the third season to have returning contestants versus new contestants (seasons 8 & 10 respectively). Season 8 was the first time the series was titled Fans vs Faves.

Mitch & Mark won the series with their house selling for over $4.04m. All houses sold on auction day with all teams profiting well over $295k.

Contestants

This season introduces 3 new couples (dubbed "Fans") and 2 returning couples (dubbed "Favourites"/"Faves"). The couples selected were as follows: Of the new "Fans" Josh & Luke Packham have previously participated on Love Island Australia.

Notes

Cheating Scandal
Schedule Scandal

Two of the teams — House 3's Tanya and Vito and House 4's Josh and Luke — had a photo of the production schedule, which meant they knew exactly when certain rooms would be called, and the dates of challenge days. Josh and Luke said that they received the photo but wouldn't say from where, and after denials, Tanya and Vito revealed that Tanya had sent the photo to Luke. Tanya said that she received the photo from a former tradesperson on The Block. Having the production schedule was a massive advantage. When the photo was brought to Scott Cam's attention, he wiped the schedule clean and said they would pick rooms at random to complete for the rest of the season. Scott Cam punished Tanya and Vito and Josh and Luke by deducting two points per team, effectively ruling them out from winning Basement Week. There was considerable anger among fans, who thought that this punishment should have been harsher.

In the final episode of the show, during the final interviews, Tanya was questioned about the cheating scandal once again. She again said that she hadn't taken the photograph and showed a text feed between her and a supposed ex-tradie from The Block. Her partner Vito was supporting and also denied the suspicions.

However, House 4's Josh & Luke decided to 'get [the truth] off their chests' and did a full tell-all interview. They explained how during the filming of the promotion, they were using the toilets in the production office (which was another house being rented out by Nine Network). When Luke went to use the bathroom he noticed an open door, which was Scotty's office. The entire production schedule was written on a whiteboard at the back of the room. Luke was only able to memorise the first 3–4 weeks on the schedule but never considered taking a photo. Later in the day, Luke (and possibly Josh) was approached by Tanya, who asked if they could be on guard for her while she took a photo. They reluctantly agreed.

The twins explained that the reason they had kept quiet was because Tanya wasn't willing to say her part in it. During Half Basement Week (the week the scandal was exposed), Josh & Luke came out but Tanya initially did not wish to. Josh and Luke initially kept her identity anonymous because of this reason. They later managed to convince Tanya to come out with her part by implementing the fake ex-tradie story which most people believed.

Josh & Luke also explained that they didn't want to go against Tanya's will because they wouldn't have been able to get several things signed off by them, including a moved driveway and ability to use their property for access so that they could dig their pool.

While the contestants were waiting for their reserves the day before Auctions, they were informed of the twins' story. Ronnie & Georgia and Mitch & Mark had suspected that this had been the case but had never known for sure. When Josh & Luke arrived, Luke apologised for his part in the scandal and this was generally accepted by the other contestants.

While driving to meet the other contestants, Tanya was annoyed at the twins for not informing her that they were going to tell the truth. Her husband Vito responded by saying that he was still on her side and would support her. Tanya got very upset when confronted by other contestants about it, and using Mitch's words, "... it's too late, now she's caught."

Laundry Scandal

Because of the Schedule Scandal, the Block was thrown into disarray because all of the pre booked and planned work had to be restructured. One of these problems was Kinsman, who were booked in to do the laundries during the now Living & Dining Week. The contestants were told that they had to prep their laundries for install by Kinsman as well as doing their living/dining rooms. If they managed to complete this during the week, Kinsman would install for free as they were a sponsor. However, if a team failed to complete it they would have to pay for install during another week. All teams managed to complete it in time except for Tanya & Vito. As per the rules Tanya & Vito were required to pay for their late install, but instead they manipulated Kinsman who agreed to do it for free. However, the other contestants stepped in and caught Tanya & Vito out and made sure they paid for their laundries.

Reaction

Fans were angered by the whole scandal, particularly Tanya's failure to reveal the truth until the final episode. Most fans felt that the punishment should have been much higher, and like suggested by Ronnie, have all points and extra money taken away from the responsible teams. Some fans even felt that the auction results of the two teams should have been changed, mainly Tanya and Vito's.

The producers and casting agents of the show were also brought under fire, fans questioning the choices of Josh & Luke and Tanya & Vito as contestants. Many fans felt that the casting agents should have spotted the bad qualities in the contestants and not cast them. They also questioned the casting of Josh & Luke, as former Love Island contestants many felt that they were cast just to cause drama and as advertising for the show.

Theories

Fans have speculated many theories about the scandal and why Tanya would feel the need to take the photo in the first place. One of these theories is that Tanya may have felt disadvantaged as she was up against a bunch of All Stars.

Score history

Weekly Room Budget

Weekly Room Prize

Results

Judges' Scores
 Colour key:
  Highest Score
  Lowest Score

Challenge scores

Auction

Ratings

Notes

References

2021 Australian television seasons
17